Thorncross is a small hamlet in the South West of the Isle of Wight, England. (The Back of the Wight). It is located near the hamlets of Yafford, Limerstone and  the village of Brighstone.

References 

Villages on the Isle of Wight
Brighstone